Melaleuca zonalis is a shrub in the myrtle family Myrtaceae and is endemic to the south-west of Western Australia. It is a shrub with several stems, mostly spoon-shaped leaves and usually pale yellow flowers which age to pink.  Whilst it is common, it is restricted to a relatively small area.

Description

The flowers appear from October to December and are yellow, pale lemon-white or cream, turning pink with age. The stamens are arranged in five bundles around the flower, with 8 to 13 stamens in each bundle.

Taxonomy and naming
Melaleuca zonalis was first formally described in 1999 by Lyndley Craven in a review of the genus. The specific epithet (zonalis) is from the Greek ζώνη (zone) meaning "belt" or "girdle" referring "to the apparently common occurrence of this species on the lateritic belt of the Gairdner Range in Western Australia".

Distribution and habitat
Melaleuca zonalis occurs from Eneabba to the Gairdner Range in the Lesueur National Park in the Geraldton Sandplains biogeographic region. It grows on grey sandy gravel over laterite on outcrops, valleys and hills.

Conservation
Melaleuca zonalis is classified as "not threatened" by the Government of Western Australia Department of Parks and Wildlife.

Uses
This species contains both monoterpene and sesquiterpene essential oils but the yield is low.

References

zonalis
Myrtales of Australia
Plants described in 1999
Endemic flora of Western Australia
Taxa named by Lyndley Craven